Bill Gregg (25 August 1914 – 23 January 2000) was an Australian rules footballer who played with Essendon in the Victorian Football League (VFL).

Notes

External links 
		

1914 births
2000 deaths
Australian rules footballers from Victoria (Australia)
Essendon Football Club players